"The Zygon Invasion" is the seventh episode of the ninth series of the British science fiction television series Doctor Who. It was first broadcast on BBC One on 31 October 2015, and written by Peter Harness and directed by Daniel Nettheim. The episode is the first episode of a two-part story, the second part being "The Zygon Inversion", which aired on 7 November.

In the episode, a peace treaty agreed between humans and shapeshifting aliens called Zygons in the 50th anniversary special "The Day of the Doctor" has started to fail. A radicalised splinter group of Zygons, seeking to no longer hide among humans but be themselves, takes over Zygon High Command and seeks to invade present-day Earth and neutralise UNIT. The alien time traveller the Twelfth Doctor (Peter Capaldi) attempts to keep the peace.

Plot
Ever since the War, Tenth, and Eleventh Doctors ensured the creation of a peace treaty between humans and Zygons, there existed two versions of UNIT scientist Osgood: one human and a Zygon duplicate. 20 million Zygons have been resettled on Earth, peacefully living out their lives disguised as humans. The Doctor leaves the Osgoods the Osgood Box to be used as a last resort. After one of the Osgoods was killed, the other left UNIT and disappeared.

In the present, Osgood is captured by a splinter group of Zygons in the town of Truth or Consequences, New Mexico just after sending a warning to the Twelfth Doctor that the treaty is failing. In London, the splinter group, which seeks to be themselves no matter what, kidnaps and kills Zygon High Command, leaving a Zygon called Bonnie in charge. In Turmezistan, Osgood is forced to read a video message declaring the splinter group's intent to go to war. At the block of flats where Clara lives, Clara is knocked unconscious and hidden in a pod underground. Bonnie takes Clara's place.

The Doctor travels to Turmezistan via the aeroplane afforded him by being President of Earth to rescue Osgood. The Doctor and UNIT troops converge on the church Osgood is holed up in. The Zygon splinter group, appearing as the soldiers' relatives and friends, kills the soldiers and flees back to the UK through underground tunnels. The Doctor finds Osgood safe under the church. The Doctor and Osgood bring a Zygon, injured from a bombing run, aboard their flight back to the UK. The Zygon tells the Doctor that their invasion has already taken place.

In New Mexico, UNIT leader Kate Stewart finds Truth or Consequences uninhabited aside from the sheriff, Norlander. The sheriff reveals herself as a Zygon, and prepares to kill Kate. In London, Bonnie tricks UNIT scientist Jac into going to Clara's block with UNIT troops, where a lift takes them to a series of underground tunnels, which lifts across the city are connected to. When one pod is revealed to contain Clara, Jac realises that Clara was switched with a Zygon. Jac and the troops are killed by the splinter group when they attempt to escape. Bonnie travels to UNIT to obtain a shoulder-fired missile. She goes to the coast and contacts the Doctor, informing him of the deaths of his friends. She fires the missile at the plane.

Continuity
Events from the Fourth Doctor serial Terror of the Zygons (1975) are brought up in the episode. Kate mentions this previous Zygon attack taking place in either the 1970s or 1980s, referring to the UNIT dating controversy regarding in which decade the Third and Fourth Doctors' UNIT stories actually took place. Kate references Harry Sullivan, a companion to the Fourth Doctor in this serial, as the "naval surgeon" that helped create the Z67 anti-Zygon nerve gas. Kate states the gas was developed in secret at Porton Down, alluding to Harry's location as reported by the Brigadier in the serial Mawdryn Undead (1983).

Following from her appearances in "The Day of the Doctor" (2013) and "Death in Heaven" (2014), both Osgoods are shown wearing costume elements of the Doctor's earlier incarnations. In addition to the Fourth Doctor's scarf, one Osgood is shown with a bow tie similar to the Eleventh Doctor's, while the other wears a question mark-decorated sweater vest similar to that worn by the Seventh Doctor. Both have shirts with question marks on the collar points, a common element of the Fourth, Fifth and Sixth Doctors' outfits. Osgood asks the Doctor why he does not use the question mark motif any more, to which he replies that he still does – on his underpants.

A portrait of the First Doctor is displayed by the stairs in the UNIT safe house.

The Doctor remarks that he once "snogged a Zygon". The Tenth Doctor kissed a Zygon impersonating Queen Elizabeth in "The Day of the Doctor".

The Doctor resumes the position of "President of the World" and the use of the plane afforded by that position, both mentioned in "Death in Heaven". However, when he introduces himself as President of the World, he is told, "yes, we know who you are." This continues a running joke from earlier in the series: Prime Minister Harriet Jones is regularly told this after introducing herself, multiple times in both "The Christmas Invasion" (2005), and in "The Stolen Earth" (2008).

The Doctor suggests that Osgood is a hybrid between a Zygon and human, continuing the theme of hybrids mentioned in "The Magician's Apprentice" / "The Witch's Familiar", "The Girl Who Died" and "The Woman Who Lived".

Outside references
The Doctor plays the opening to the hymn "Amazing Grace" on his electric guitar.

Clara claims to memorize obscure facts to help her win at Trivial Pursuit, a popular trivia quiz board game. She also explains, from her knowledge of Trivial Pursuit, how the town of Truth or Consequences got its name from the television show Truth or Consequences.

As well as identifying himself as "Dr. Disco", the Doctor also calls himself "Dr. Funkenstein" after a song of the same name by the band Parliament.

The episode pays homage to several science-fiction classics, including Invasion of the Body Snatchers and The Midwich Cuckoos.

When the Doctor enters the presidential plane he raises both of his hands showing the victory sign, a pose commonly associated with former US president Richard Nixon.

Broadcast and reception
The episode was watched by 3.87 million viewers overnight in the UK and received a 19.4%. It received an Appreciation Index score of 82. Overall the episode had 5.76 million viewers.

Critical reception

"The Zygon Invasion" received positive reviews. Based on 18 critic reviews, the episode holds a score of 94% on Rotten Tomatoes, with an average score of 7.74/10. The site's consensus reads "With "The Zygon Invasion," Doctor Who delivers a thrilling episode that pays special attention to character development and the consequences of time travel". Aspects of the episode particularly praised by critics included the characterisation of Osgood, the cliffhanger ending and the political themes running through the episode.

Tim Martin of The Daily Telegraph awarded the episode four stars out of five, particularly praising Osgood's characterisation as "Earnest, resourceful and an unabashed superfan". Ross Ruediger of New York magazine highly acclaimed the episode, awarding it five stars out of five. He opened his review by saying that the episode "arguably became the most important Doctor Who episode since “Vincent and the Doctor” tackled depression back in 2010". He also praised Harness' script, saying he did "a great job" with the character of Osgood, and praised the Zygons as "frankly pretty terrifying". He also praised Clara's plot twist, by stating "The episode’s greatest triumph in this area is what was done with Clara, which is shocking on the first viewing and masterful on a second". Scott Collura of IGN also praised the episode, awarding it a score of 7.8, deemed as a "Good" score. He particularly praised the character of Osgood in the episode and the "refugee subtext", while stating that it "poses some thought-provoking questions".

Kaite Welsh of IndieWire highly acclaimed the episode, awarding it a grade of A++, the highest grade possible. Calling the episode a "classic", she further said that it "more than lives up to the hype, with some stellar political commentary, brilliant performances and some very creepy child actors". She further praised the episode's political themes by saying "The parallels between immigration debates aren't exactly subtle here, but they're so well-drawn it's impossible to mind". Alasdair Wilkins of The A.V. Club also enjoyed the episode, awarding it a B+ grade. He said that the episode "is methodical in how it paces the setup for next week's story... But no matter, because there are still plenty of some standout scenes here, in particular Hitchley's standoff with his mother in front of the church". He closed his review by saying "the only real questions to answer are does this episode generate anticipation for next week, and does this episode position 'The Zygon Inversion' to go to places and explore things it couldn’t reach if it weren’t the back half of a two-parter? I’d say yes on both counts".

In print

A novelisation of this episode and "The Zygon Inversion" written by Peter Harness will be released in paperback 13 July 2023 under the title The Zygon Invasion as part of the Target Collection.

Notes

References

External links

Twelfth Doctor episodes
2015 British television episodes
Films with screenplays by Peter Harness
UNIT serials
Doctor Who stories set on Earth
Television episodes set in New Mexico
Television episodes set in London